Mordellistena cervicalis is a beetle in the genus Mordellistena of the family Mordellidae. It was described in 1862 by John Lawrence LeConte.

It is found in North America  in the east

References

cervicalis
Beetles described in 1862